The 2017 Chinese FA Women's Cup was the 11th edition of the Chinese FA Women's Cup. Jiangsu Suning won their 2nd title after beating Changchun Rural Commercial Bank in the penalty shoot-out.

Results

Group stage

Group A

Group B

Group C

Group D

Play-offs

First round
Semi-final

5th–8th place Play-offs

9th–12th place Play-offs

13th–16th place Play-offs

Second round
15th place Play-offs

13th place Play-offs

11th place Play-offs

9th place Play-offs

7th place Play-offs

5th place Play-offs

3rd place Play-offs

Final

Final standings

References

2017 in Chinese football
June 2017 sports events in China
2017 in Chinese women's sport